Vagococcus entomophilus is a Gram-positive, facultatively anaerobic and coccus-shaped bacterium from the genus of Vagococcus which has been isolated from the digestive tract of a common wasp.

References 

Lactobacillales
Bacteria described in 2014